Bosworth Independent School is a private co-educational boarding school, located in Northampton, England. Previously known as Bosworth Independent College, the school's name was changed in February 2023.

Organisation
The School is part of the CATS Global Schools. It was founded in 1977.

Academics
The School offers programmes for Year 7, Year 8, Year 9, 2-year GCSE, 1-year GCSE, 2-year A-level, 18-month A-level and A-level preparation.

Buildings
Aside from the main Newton Building, the School has several other buildings around the Barrack Road and St. Georges Avenue area.

Teaching Buildings
The Newton Building

Recreational Buildings
Bosworth Hall (formerly St. George's Hall)

Boarding Facilities
St. George's
Poplars
Farthings
Calderfield
Lime Trees
Victoria House
Senior Houses

The School also operates a Senior House boarding system with some older students living in houses owned by the school in the surrounding area

References

External links
 

Boarding schools in Northamptonshire
Private schools in West Northamptonshire District
Educational institutions established in 1977
1977 establishments in England